Parc des Félins is a zoological park in France dedicated to the breeding and conservation of wild members of the cat family.

Of the 41 recognized species of felines in the world, the park has 30 different species and subspecies, with a total of 140 cats.

The park opened to the public on October 14, 2006. Originally, the majority of the animals came from the Parc d'Aulneau, which was deemed too small to house this many animals.

History
1998: The Parc d'Aulneau opens.
2005: The Parc d'Aulneau becomes too small and a new place is sought.
2006: The location of the park is chosen at the height of Fortelle at Nesles in Seine-et-Marne.
2007: The park accommodates a wildcat, two leopard cats, two sand cats, a Siberian tiger, two margays, two oncillas and two rusty-spotted cats.

Visiting the park

The park's philosophy is to provide for the well-being of the animals, and to provide an environment conducive to their reproduction. The enclosures were studied in depth to ensure the optimal environmental conditions of each animal.

The park is divided into four geographic areas. Each animal's area is accompanied by an illustrated board with the name and description of the animal, the specifics of the animal's enclosure, and the dangers to the animal in its natural environment.

European circuit
The European circuit begins at the enclosure of the cheetahs. There are only two enclosures in this circuit, located in the woods, and they are occupied by wildcats (Felis silvestris silvestris) and Eurasian lynx (Lynx lynx lynx).

African circuit

At the start of the visit one begins with the Southern African cheetahs (Acinonyx jubatus jubatus) which have an enclosure roomy enough for them to run. At the end of the cheetah enclosure, the European circuit begins to the left. By going straight on the African circuit and travel along the enclosure of the African lions (Panthera leo melanochaita). At the end of the enclosure one can either turn and start the Asian circuit to the right or start the American circuit to the left.

The African circuit continues to the left and the first enclosure is occupied by servals (Leptailurus serval). On both sides of the way we first see the sand cats (Felis margarita), then the African wildcats (Felis lybica gordoni) and the Persian leopards (Panthera pardus tulliana), and finally the caracals (Caracal caracal).

The circuit concludes with the white lions (Panthera leo melanochaita), a rarity in zoos, followed by the black panthers (Panthera pardus) and finally the lion (Panthera leo).

Soon the park will have black-footed cats (Felis nigripes) - their enclosures are currently ready and are holding the fishing cats.

American circuit

The American circuit starts at the end of the Katanga lion enclosure. The first habitat of this circuit holds the ocelots (Leopardus pardalis), and next to it is the jaguar (Panthera onca) enclosure.

The path continues past the enclosures of the margays (Leopardus wiedi), Geoffroy's cats (Oncifelis geoffroyi), the oncillas (Leopardus tigrinus), and the pumas (Puma concolor). Finally one arrives at a dead end, to admire the jaguarundis (Herpailurus yaguarondi) which are very rare in European zoos.

The path ends with the enclosures of the bobcats (Lynx rufus) and the jaguars.

Asian circuit

The Asian circuit starts at the other end of the Katanga lion enclosure. The first felines on this path are the Sumatran tigers (Panthera tigris sumatrae), followed by the enclosure of the rusty-spotted cats.  Further on is the rare Sri Lanka leopard (Panthera pardus kotiya), the Asian golden cats (Catopuma temmincki), the Asian leopard cats (Prionailurus bengalensis bengalensis), the jungle cats (Felis chaus), and the fishing cats (Prionailurus viverrinus).

The path continues with large enclosures containing tigers (Panthera tigris, particularly Siberian tigers), Amur leopards (Panthera pardus orientalis) and Eurasian lynx (Lynx lynx wrangeli). The path ends with the eastern Siberian and Mongolian leopard cats (Prionailurus bengalensis euptilura), clouded leopards (Neofelis nebulosa), snow leopards (Panthera uncia) and Pallas's cats (Otocolobus manul).

Lemurs

In addition to the felids, there is a large lemur population in the park.  Many lemur species are represented, including the ring-tailed lemur (Lemur catta), the red ruffed lemur (Varecia rubra), the crowned lemur (Eulemur coronatus), and the red-bellied lemur (Eulemur rubriventer).  Many of the lemurs roam freely about the park, and occasionally interact with visitors.

References

External links

Zoos in France
Buildings and structures in Seine-et-Marne
Organizations based in Île-de-France
Tourist attractions in Seine-et-Marne
Zoos established in 2006